Rudreshwar is a village development committee in Baitadi District in the Mahakali Zone of western Nepal. At the time of the 1991 Nepal census it had a population of 2,652 and had 481 houses in the village. A number of people have used this village as a setting in fictional books, such as Edward Von Killham III in his book "Agreeing to disagree".

References

Populated places in Baitadi District